The Moldova women's national under-17 football team represents Moldova in international football at this age level and is controlled by the Moldovan Football Federation, the governing body for football in Moldova. The team is considered to be the feeder team for the senior Moldovan women's national football team. The team competes to qualify for the UEFA Women's Under-17 Championship held every year. Since the establishment of the Moldovan women's under-17 team, the under-17 side has never reached a final tournament of the UEFA Women's Under-17 Championship. Players born on or after 1 January 2006 are eligible for the 2023 UEFA Women's Under-17 Championship qualification. They are currently coached by Elena Subbotina.

Competition history

UEFA U-17 European Championship

2023 UEFA Women's Under-17 Championship

Round 1 (League B)

Round 2 (League B)

All-time record
Only competitive matches are included.

See also
Moldova women's national football team
Moldova women's national under-19 football team

References

External links
 Moldova U-17 team at uefa.com
 Moldova U-17 team at soccerway

Under-17
Women's national under-17 association football teams
European women's national under-17 association football teams